The 2022 Open Castilla y León was a professional tennis tournament played on outdoor hard courts. It was the 36th edition of the tournament and part of the 2022 ATP Challenger Tour. It took place in El Espinar, Segovia, Spain, between 25 and 31 July 2022.

Singles main draw entrants

Seeds 

 1 Rankings as of 18 July 2022.

Other entrants 
The following players received wildcards into the singles main draw:
  Julio César Porras
  Alejandro Moro Cañas
  Daniel Rincón

The following player received entry into the singles main draw as a special exempt:
  Denis Yevseyev

The following players received entry into the singles main draw as alternates:
  Nicolás Álvarez Varona
  Illya Marchenko

The following players received entry from the qualifying draw:
  Alberto Barroso Campos
  Gabriel Décamps
  Denis Istomin
  Alibek Kachmazov
  Benjamin Lock
  Adrián Menéndez Maceiras

Champions

Singles

 Hugo Grenier def.  Constant Lestienne 7–5, 6–3.

Doubles

 Nicolás Álvarez Varona /  Iñaki Montes de la Torre def.  Benjamin Lock /  Courtney John Lock 7–6(7–3), 6–3.

References

Open Castilla y León
2022 in Spanish tennis
July 2022 sports events in Spain
2022